Thatiana Regina Ignácio (born 2 July 1983) is a retired Brazilian athlete who specialised in the sprinting events. She competed with her teammates in the 4 × 100 metres relay at the 2005 and 2007 World Championships finishing fifth on the first occasion. She won multiple medals at the regional level.

She has personal bests of 11.45 seconds in the 100 metres (2007) and 23.92 seconds in the 200 metres (2005).

Competition record

References

1983 births
Living people
Athletes (track and field) at the 2007 Pan American Games
Brazilian female sprinters
Pan American Games athletes for Brazil
Universiade medalists in athletics (track and field)
South American Games gold medalists for Brazil
South American Games medalists in athletics
Competitors at the 2002 South American Games
Universiade bronze medalists for Brazil
Medalists at the 2003 Summer Universiade
21st-century Brazilian women